Domenico Crusco (19 August 1934 − 25 August 2013) was an Italian Roman Catholic bishop.

Ordained to the priesthood in 1961, Crusco was named bishop in 1991. In 1999, he became bishop of the Roman Catholic Diocese of San Marco Argentano-Scalea, Italy and retired in 2011.

References

1934 births
2013 deaths
People from Cosenza
Bishops in Calabria